The women's 7.5 km sprint competition at the Biathlon World Championships 2023 was held on 10 February 2023.

Results
The race was started at 14:30.

References

Women's sprint